The 1969 football season was São Paulo's 40th season since club's existence.

Statistics

Scorers

Overall
{|class="wikitable"
|-
|Games played || 65 (29 Campeonato Paulista, 16 Torneio Roberto Gomes Pedrosa, 20 Friendly match)
|-
|Games won || 34 (17 Campeonato Paulista, 5 Torneio Roberto Gomes Pedrosa, 12 Friendly match)
|-
|Games drawn || 10 (3 Campeonato Paulista, 4 Torneio Roberto Gomes Pedrosa, 3 Friendly match)
|-
|Games lost || 21 (9 Campeonato Paulista, 7 Torneio Roberto Gomes Pedrosa, 5 Friendly match)
|-
|Goals scored ||  104
|-
|Goals conceded || 86
|-
|Goal difference || +18
|-
|Best result || 4–1 (H) v Guarani - Campeonato Paulista - 1969.02.02 4–1 (H) v São Bento - Campeonato Paulista - 1969.02.26 4–1 (H) v Flamengo - Torneio Roberto Gomes Pedrosa - 1969.11.19
|-
|Worst result || 0–4 (A) v Valencia - Friendly match - 1969.06.290–4 (A) v America-RJ - Torneio Roberto Gomes Pedrosa - 1969.11.26
|-
|Most appearances || Cláudio Deodato (62)
|-
|Top scorer || Zé Roberto (27)
|-

Friendlies

Troféo Bodas de Oro
Friendly tournament played in June 1969 to commemorate the first 50 years of Valencia CF.

Troféo Colombino

Tournoi Mohammed V

Official competitions

Campeonato Paulista

Record

Torneio Roberto Gomes Pedrosa

Record

References

External links
official website 

Association football clubs 1969 season
1969
1969 in Brazilian football